The DuQuoin State Fair is an annual festival, centering on the themes of agriculture and country music, hosted by the U.S. state of Illinois on a 1,200-acre fairground site adjacent to the southern Illinois town of Du Quoin.  The state fair has been celebrated almost every year since 1923.  Currently, the fair is held annually over an 11-day period concluding on Labor Day of each year.

History and current events
The DuQuoin Fair was organized in 1923 by William R. "W.R." Hayes and a consortium of Du Quoin developers.  They promoted the private-sector enterprise as a short-duration race meeting specializing in harness racing.  Starting with a half-mile track, the developer eventually built the mile-long DuQuoin State Fairgrounds Racetrack on the fairgrounds.  The racetrack hosted the Hambletonian trotting event in 1957-1980 and the World Trotting Derby in 1981-2009.  The racetrack is used today for ARCA and USAC motor sporting events.

With the departure of the Hambletonian, the DuQuoin Fair faced economic challenges and was taken over from the private sector in the 1980s by the state of Illinois.  Since that time, it has been operated by the Illinois Department of Agriculture as a state fair with a distinctive Southern Illinois heritage.

Although the host town of the fair is spelled "Du Quoin", with a space, the Department of Agriculture refers to the fair as the "DuQuoin State Fair", with the space omitted.

No fair was held between 1942–45 nor 2020.

References

August events
Fairs in Illinois
September events
State fairs
Traveling carnivals
Festivals established in 1923